The St. George Illawarra Dragons are a rugby league club jointly based in Kogarah and Wollongong, New South Wales who compete in the National Rugby League. The club was formed on 23 September 1998 by a merger of the St. George Dragons and the Illawarra Steelers and they played their first competitive match in 1999 against the Parramatta Eels, losing 20–10. The club shares home games between Jubilee Oval and Wollongong Showground.

The club have competed in 23 seasons over their history, winning four trophies. These include one premiership (2010), two minor premierships (2009, 2010) and one World Club Challenge (2011). These achievements are listed below in bold.

Seasons

References

External links 

 St. George Illawarra Dragons seasons – Rugby League Project
St. George Illawarra Dragons seasons – AFL Tables

 
National Rugby League lists
Australian rugby league club seasons
Sydney-sport-related lists